The Red Rider is a 1934 American Western film serial from Universal Pictures and starring Buck Jones. It has 15 chapters based on the short story "The Redhead from Sun Dog" by W. C. Tuttle, and is a remake of Buck Jones' earlier 1931 film The Range Feud.

Plot
Sheriff "Red" Davison (Buck Jones), the sheriff of Sun Dog, is shocked when he hears his good friend "Silent" Slade (Grant Withers) has been accused of murdering a man named Scotty McKee (J.P. McGowan). He feels that Slade was framed and denied a fair trial. When Slade is sentenced to hang, Red allows him to escape from jail, sacrificing his job and his good reputation in the process. Red and his horse Silver then follow Slade in an attempt to aid him in proving his innocence.

Cast
 Buck Jones as "Red" Davidson
 Grant Withers as "Silent" Slade
 Marion Shilling as Marie Maxwell
 Walter Miller as Jim Breen
 Richard Cramer as Joe Portos
 Silver as Silver, Red's Horse
 Charles K. French as Robert Maxwell
 Margaret La Marr as Joan McKee
 Edmund Cobb as Johnny Snow
 Monte Montague as Bill Abel, one of Portos' henchmen
 Jim Thorpe as Al Abel, one of Portos' henchmen
 William Desmond as Sheriff Campbell
 Lee Beggs as Mayor "Soapy" Caswell
 Robert McGowan as Hubert Sund
 J. Frank Glendon as an Attorney

Production
The Red Rider was based on the short story "The Redhead from Sun Dog" by W. C. Tuttle.

Stunts
 Cliff Lyons
 Tom Steele

Chapter titles
 Sentenced to Die
 A Leap for Life
 The Night Attack
 A Treacherous Ambush
 Trapped
 The Brink of Death
 The Fatal Plunge
 The Stampede
 The Posse Rider
 The Avenging Trail
 The Lost Diamonds
 Double Trouble
 The Night Raiders
 In the Enemies' Hideout
 Brought to Justice
Source:

See also
 List of film serials
 List of film serials by studio

References

External links

1934 films
American black-and-white films
1930s English-language films
Films based on short fiction
Remakes of American films
Films directed by Lew Landers
Universal Pictures film serials
1934 Western (genre) films
American Western (genre) films
Films with screenplays by George H. Plympton
1930s American films